Griesemer's Mill Bridge is a historic wooden covered bridge located at Oley Township in Berks County, Pennsylvania. It has a gable roof and stone abutments. It crosses the Manatawny Creek. It is one of five covered bridges remaining in Berks County.

It was listed on the National Register of Historic Places in 1981.

References

External links

Berks County Covered Bridges
 Griesemer's Mill Covered Bridge, 3.5 miles north of State Route 562, spanning Manatawny Creek, Yellow House, Berks County, PA: 2 photos and 2 data pages at Historic American Buildings Survey

Historic American Buildings Survey in Pennsylvania
Covered bridges on the National Register of Historic Places in Pennsylvania
Covered bridges in Berks County, Pennsylvania
Bridges completed in 1868
Wooden bridges in Pennsylvania
Bridges in Berks County, Pennsylvania
National Register of Historic Places in Berks County, Pennsylvania
Road bridges on the National Register of Historic Places in Pennsylvania
Burr Truss bridges in the United States
1868 establishments in Pennsylvania